Wallace fountains are public drinking fountains named after, financed by and roughly designed by Sir Richard Wallace. The final design and sculpture is by Wallace's friend Charles-Auguste Lebourg. They are large cast-iron sculptures scattered throughout the city of Paris, France, mainly along the most-frequented sidewalks. A great aesthetic success, they are recognized worldwide as one of the symbols of Paris. A Wallace fountain can be seen outside the Wallace Collection in London, the gallery that houses the works of art collected by Sir Richard Wallace and the first four Marquesses of Hertford.

Background

Sir Richard Wallace

Among these philanthropists, Sir Richard Wallace (1818–1890) was one of the most eclectic and reserved. Having inherited a large fortune from his father in August 1870, he decided that all Parisians should profit from it, which made him popular. Wallace's devotion led him to remain in his Parisian villa even as the city was besieged, rather than take refuge on one of his palatial estates, to be in Paris when he was needed.

He founded a hospital, where he personally welcomed victims of the bombings and distributed supplies, among his other efforts on behalf of Parisians at war. He remained faithful to his adopted nation, France, and is buried at Père Lachaise Cemetery.

Of his numerous contributions to Parisian heritage, the best known today are the fountains which bear his name.

Why fountains?
As a result of the siege of Paris and the Commune episode, many aqueducts had been destroyed, and the price of water, already higher than normal, increased considerably. Because of this, most of the poor had to pay for water. Moreover, most of the water provided by vendors was drawn from the Seine river and was likely to be dirty, as run-off from streets and many of sewers drained into it. Hence it was safer to drink beer or other alcoholic beverages, and almost as cheap as water. The temptation to take to liquor was strong among the lower classes, and it was considered a moral duty to keep them from falling into alcoholism.  Even today, when water and hygiene are not a problem for the majority of Parisians, these fountains are often the only sources of free water for the homeless.

The poor are not the only beneficiaries of these installations. Even if the aim of the fountains was to allow people of modest means to have access to drinking water, they are not the only ones who use them. Anyone passing by may quench his thirst, fulfilling this vital need. There was already a programme of constructing temperance fountains in both the United States and in the United Kingdom.

Not only did the fountains accomplish Wallace's philosophy of helping the needy, but they also beautified Paris.

Conception
Richard Wallace designed the fountains himself and intended them to be beautiful as well as useful. The fountains had to meet several strict guidelines:

Height: They had to be tall enough to be seen from afar but not so tall as to destroy the harmony of the surrounding landscape.
Form: Both practical to use and pleasing to the eye.
Price: Affordable enough to allow the installation of dozens.
Materials: Resistant to the elements, easy to shape, and simple to maintain.

The locations, as well as the color (a dark green, like all urban development of that era, in order to blend in with the parks and tree-lined avenues), were quickly chosen by the city government.

Wallace created two different models, which were followed by two additional models, thus there were four types of Wallace fountains varying in such properties as height and motif.  They were made of cast iron.  Inexpensive, easy to mold, and robust, it was one of the most popular materials of the age.  The majority of the cost was paid for by Wallace.  The city of Paris allocated 1,000 francs for the large model and 450 francs for the wall-mounted model.

The fountains are still molded by the historical foundry G.H.M

Sculptor
Wishing that his project be completed as rapidly as possible, Wallace called on Charles-Auguste Lebourg, a sculptor from Nantes whom he knew and whose talents were already renowned.  Lebourg improved Wallace's sketches, already studied and thought-provoking, to make the fountains true works of art.

For the large model, Lebourg created four caryatids representing kindness, simplicity, charity and sobriety.  Each one is different from her sisters, by the way she bends her knees and where her tunic is tucked into her blouse.

Different models
The first two models (large model and applied model) were conceived and financed by Sir Richard Wallace.  The two other models were created following the success of their predecessors inspired by the same styles and the resemblance is obvious. The more recent designs are not as strongly steeped in Wallace's aesthetic ideals, that in true Renaissance style, they should be useful, beautiful, and symbolic, in addition to being real works of art.

Large model
(size: 2.71 m, 610 kg)

The large model was conceived by Sir Richard Wallace, and was inspired by the Fontaine des Innocents.  On a foundation of Hauteville stone rests an octagonal pedestal on which four caryatids are affixed with their backs turned and their arms supporting a pointed dome decorated by dolphins.

The water is distributed in a slender trickle issuing from the center of the dome and falls down into a basin that is protected by a grille. To make distribution easier, two tin-plated, iron cups attached to the fountain by a small chain were at the drinker's desire, staying always submerged for cleanliness.  These cups were removed in 1952 "for Hygiene reasons" by demand of the Council of Public Hygiene of the old Department of the Seine.

For more information, see the Technical File (in French).

Wall-mounted model
(size: 1.96 m, 300 kg)

Sir Richard's other model. In the middle of a semi-circular pediment, the head of a naiad issues a trickle of water that falls into a basin resting between two pilasters.  Two goblets allowed the water to be drunk, but they were retired under the 1952 law cited above.  This model, costing little to install, was to have been many units along the lengths of the walls of buildings with strong humanitarian focus, e.g. hospitals.  This was not the case, and they do not remain today except for one situated on rue Geoffroy Saint-Hilaire.

Small model
(size: 1.32 m, 130 kg)

These are simple pushbutton fountains that one can find in squares and public gardens and are marked with the Parisian Seal (although the one installed on the Place des Invalides lacks this seal).  They are familiar to mothers who bring their children to play in the many small parks in Paris.

Measuring only 4'-3" and weighing 286 lbs., they were commissioned by the mayor of Paris more frequently than its older sister models.

Colonnade model
(size: 2.50 m, a little more than 500 kg)

This model was the last to be realized.  The general shape resembles that of the Large Model and the caryatids were replaced with small columns to reduce the cost of fabrication.  The dome was also less pointy and the lower part more curved.

Although 30 of these were made, today there remain only two, one on rue de Rémusat and the other on avenue des Ternes.

Placement

The choice of the location of the fountains was left to the city of Paris.  They needed to be placed at the will of the public in a practical manner and integrated in the most harmonious fashion with the environment.  Most were placed in squares or at the intersections of two roads.  The responsibility for choosing such locations fell to Eugene Belgrand, a hydraulic engineer and Director of Water and Sewers of Paris who worked with the prefect Georges-Eugène Haussmann.

Today
Most of the 100 grand model Wallace fountains currently in Paris function and distribute perfectly potable water. Once, these fountains were rare points of free water in the city, much to the relief of the homeless and poor. Today, they are among more than 1,200 points of free, clean drinking water dispensed to citizens and visitors by the city water company, Eau de Paris. 

The fountains work from March 15 to November 15 (the risk of freezing during the months of winter would imperil the internal plumbing), are regularly maintained and are repainted every few years.

They are an integral part of the Parisian landscape, of the same importance as the Eiffel Tower or the street urchins of Montmartre.  

In Amélie, the cinegraphic piece about the glory of Parisian folklore, Jean-Pierre Jeunet baptised a personality Madeleine Wallace (she cried like a madeleine, or like a Wallace fountain), although the English subtitled version renamed the character of Madeleine, to Madeleine Wells for cultural understanding.

Wallace fountains have been a beloved part of the Paris streetscape for almost 150 years. These monuments have never suffered from public criticism. They have always been respected. However, only two Wallace fountains, both located in Place Louis Lépine, are classified as registered historic monuments.

In 2018, the Society of the Wallace Fountains (La Société des Fontaines Wallace) was registered in France as an international, non-profit association governed by the French law of July 1901.  The Society's purpose is education and information. Its mission is to promote, preserve and protect the Wallace fountains for future generation.  In addition, the Society recognizes and encourages partnerships for the common good in the spirit of Sir Richard Wallace.

Locations

Paris

67 large model fountains

2nd arrondissement

 Rue Saint-Spire, rue d'Alexandrie

3rd arrondissement

 Boulevard de Sébastopol, square Chautemps
 Passage du Pont aux biches
 Rue de la corderie, place Nathalie Lemel

4th arrondissement

 Place Louis Lépine, next to the Chambre de Commerce
 Place Louis Lépine, next to the Hôtel-dieu
 7, Boulevard du Palais
 123, rue Saint-Antoine / 1 rue de Rivoli
 Rue Grenier sur l'Eau / Allée des Justes

5th arrondissement

 Rue Poliveau, face rue de l'Essai
 Place Maubert (fountain removed)
 37, rue de la Bûcherie
 Rue des Patriarches / Place Bernard Halpern
 Rue de l'Estrapade / rue Thouin
 Rue Geoffroy Saint Hilarie / Rue Poliveau

6th arrondissement

 Place Saint-Germain-des-Prés
 Place Saint-Sulpice
 Pont Neuf, Quai des Grands Augustins
 Rue Vavin, at rue Bréa
 Place Saint-André-des-Arts

8th arrondissement

 Rue de St-Pétersbourg, at rue de Turin
 Av. des Champs-Élysées, Chevaux de Marly (north side)
 Av. des Champs-Élysées, Chevaux de Marly (south side)
 82, Avenue Marceau

9th arrondissement

 Place Gustave Toudouze
 Place de Budapest

10th arrondissement

 Place Juliette Dodu
 Place Jacques Bonsergent
 Place Robert Desnos

11th arrondissement

 143, rue de la Roquette
 197, Boulevard Voltaire
 44, rue Jean-Pierre Timbaud
 94, rue Jean-Pierre Timbaud
 1, Boulevard Richard Lenoir
 89, Boulevard Richard Lenoir

12th arrondissement

 Rue de Charenton / Boulevard Diderot
 Cours de Vincennes, face Blvd de Picpus
 Angle de St-Mandé, at rue du Rendez-vous
 Rue Descot, face Mairie du XIIe arrondissement
 Place Moussa et Odette Abadi
 Rue de Montempoivre / Rue de la Vega
 Avenue Lamoricière / Rue Fernand Foureau

13th arrondissement

 Rue de la Butte-aux-cailles, at rue de l'Espérance
 Rue Richemont / rue Domremy
 Place Jean-Delay
 Université Paris Diderot / Esplanade Pierre Vidal-Naquet
 Rue des Fréres d'Astier / Place Albert Londres
 Jardin Georges Duhamel / Rue Anouilh
 Rue Dumeril / rue Jeanne d'Arc
 Place Louis Armstrong / Blvd de l'Hôpital
 ZAC Baudricourt, 66 avenue d'Ivry

14th arrondissement

 Place de l'Abbé Jean Leboeuf
 Avenue Reille, at avenue René Coty
 Place Jules Hénaffe
 Place Edgard Quinet, at rue de la Gaîté
 Place Denfert-Rochereau, at Blvd Raspail
 Rue d'Alésia / rue Sarrette
 115 Rue de la Tombe Issoire (Réservoir de la Vanne)
 Avenue du Maine, face Mairie du 14ème arrondissement

15th arrondissement
 Place Hobart Monmarche
 Place Alain Chartier
 Place Charles Vallin
 Place Henri Rollet
 Place du Comtat-Venaissin / rue des Frères Morane
 Place du Général Beuret
 Rue des Morillons / rue Brancion
 Place Henri Quenelle / Boulevard Pasteur
 26 Rue Pèclet / Mairie du 15ème

16th arrondissement

 10, boulevard Delessert
 194, avenue de Versailles
 Place Jean Lorrain
 Place de Passy
 Place du Père Marcellin Champagnat

17th arrondissement

 12, boulevard des Batignolles / Place de Clichy
 Place Aimé Maillart / rue Pierre Demours
 Place Charles Fillion / place du Docteur-Félix-Lobligeois
 112, avenue de Villiers / Place Maréchal Juin
 Place Richard Baret / rue Mariotte
 15, avenue Niel
 1, avenue de Wagram
 Place de Lévis

18th arrondissement

 Place Emile Goudeau
 42, boulevard Rochechouart
 Rue Saint-Eleuthère, at rue Azaïs
 Place des Abbesses
 Rue de la Goutte d'or, at rue de Chartres
 Place du Château-Rouge / rue Custine

19th arrondissement

 Boulevard Sérurier / passage des Mauxins
 Ave Simon Bolivar / Rue Manin
 106 Rue Meaux at Rue du Rhin
 125 Rue Meaux / rue Petit
 Rue Lally Tollendal / Rue Armand Carrel

20th arrondissement

 Rue d'Avron / Rue Tolain
 Place Édith Piaf
 1 rue Eugène Belgrand / Mairie du 20ème
 Place Octave Chanute
 Place Joseph Epstein / rue des Partants
 Boulevard Belleville / Rue Etienne Dolet
 29, boulevard de Ménilmontant / Cimetière du Père Lachaise
 Place Maurice Chevalier
 Rue Piat, face au square

11 small model fountains

4th arrondissement

 Place Louis Lepine
 Quai de la Corse

7th arrondissement

 Place des Invalides

11th arrondissement

 32, boulevard Richard Lenoir
 74, boulevard Richard Lenoir

13th arrondissement

 Place Paul Verlaine

15th arrondissement

 Place Alain Chartier
 Place Saint Charles
 19, Place du Commerce
 35, boulevard Pasteur

17th arrondissement

 5, Place de Lévis

2 colonnaded fountains
16th arrondissement

 Rue de Rémusat, at Rue de Mirabeau

17th arrondissement

 Avenue des Ternes, at Place Pierre Demours

Wall-mounted model
5th arrondissement

 Intersection of :fr:Rue Geoffroy Saint-Hilaire and :fr:Rue Cuvier

Outside Paris
Sucy-en-Brie

11 rue du Temple

Place du la Metairie

94370

Nantes
The sculptor who created the fountains, Charles Auguste Lebourg, was originally from Nantes. In addition to the Parisian fountains, a few were placed in Nantes in honor of their creator:

 Place de la Bourse
 Parc de la Gaudinière
 Jardin des plantes, near the botanical garden
 Jardin des Plantes, Boulevard Stalingrad, bas du jardin, near the entrance to "Gare SNCF"
 Cours Cambronne

Bordeaux
On 6 October 1873, another philanthropist, Daniel Osiris, ordered six Large Model Fountains and asked the community of Bordeaux to install them. Three surviving fountains are to be found at:

 Place du Général Sarrail
 Jardin Public
 Gardens of the Hôtel de Ville

More recent fountains are to be found at:

 Place Mitchell (Mitchell was an Irishman who founded the city's first glassworks in rue de la Verrerie, creating the wine bottles that enabled the city to launch its international wine export trade)
 Cours Xavier Arnozan (ex. Pavé des Chartrons)
 Place Stalingrad
 Place Porto-Riche

Agen
 On rue Grenouilla at Boulevard de la République

Clermont-Ferrand
 Between rue du 11 novembre and la Place de Jaude

Puteaux
On Boulevard Richard Wallace

Saint-Denis, Réunion
Inside Jardin de l'État.

Toulon
 At the municipal halls of the City

Pau
 Corner boulevard de la Paix and avenue de Buros

Besançon
 In the Jardin Granvelle

Private ownership
Some wealthy people with artistic interests, as well as celebrity artists, bought them for their pleasure. This was the case with Maurice Chevalier, who had them in his ownership in Marnes-la-Coquette, and Brigitte Bardot.

Outside France
Including Barcelona, Germany, Portugal, Italy, England, Northern Ireland, Zürich, Rio de Janeiro, Canada (Quebec), New Orleans, Montevideo, Jordan, Israel, Russia and Macau, Tbilisi

Africa

Mozambique

The fountain is in the Jardim Tunduru Botanical Gardens in Maputo.

Europe

Spain
Barcelona
12 fountains were donated to Barcelona for the 1888 World Fair. Only 3 are remaining:
 La Rambla avenue, next to the wax museum. 
 Intersection of Gran Via de les Corts Catalanes with Passeig de Gràcia. One of the 4 caryatids is affectionately nicknamed Vera.
 Office premises of the Barcelona water distribution company in the district of Collblanc.

Ferrol

 On the Reina Sofia park. Donated by Juan Romero Rodriguez to the city of Ferrol after he purchased it for 1000 reales at the Exposition Universelle of 1889 in Paris.

Italy
Pontremoli
 The fountain is on the southern corner of Piazza Unità d'Italia.

Northern Ireland
Lisburn
 Castle Gardens.
 Market Square, now relocated to Wallace Park, Lisburn

Portugal
Lisbon
Rossio

Switzerland

Zürich
 In Pestalozzi Park along the Bahnhofstrasse.
Geneva
 Promenade des Bastions (near The Reformation Wall).

Russia

Moscow
 In the court-yard of Alekseevskaya Pumping station

Americas

Brazil
Rio de Janeiro
 Praça Dom Romualdo.
 Parque da Cidade.
 Alto da Boa Vista.
 Jardim Botânico.
 Praça Dom João Esberard.
 Igreja Nossa Senhora do Desterro.

Quebec, Canada
Granby
 In Isabelle Park, on the corner of rue Dufferin and boulevard Leclerc. Installed in 1956, the fountain was a gift from France to celebrate Granby's "French Week".

Montreal
 Île Notre-Dame, Parc des Îles, Jardin de la France, Montreal. This fountain was offered to the City of Montréal by the city of Paris in 1980 during the 1980 International Floralies fair held in Montreal.

Quebec City
 One at the intersection of Grande-Allée and rue Cartier; another on rue Saint-Paul, by the turning to ruelle Légaré.

California, United States
Los Angeles
At the intersection of Westwood Blvd., Kinross Ave., and Broxton Ave., Westwood Village, Los Angeles

Louisiana, United States
New Orleans
 In Latrobe Park along Decatur Street, near the French Market.

Uruguay
Montevideo
 On the corner of Yacare and Perez Castellano, outside the Mercado del Puerto.
 In the Plaza Matriz.
 In the Plaza Zabala.
 In the Plaza Cagancha.
 In front of the City Council, on the corner of 18 de Julio and Ejido.
 In the Plaza de los Treinta y Tres Orientales, right in front of the Firemen's Palace and next of the Dionisio Díaz statue.

Middle East

Jordan
Amman
 In Paris Circle, near the French Institute, in Jebel Al Weibdeh.

Israel
Haifa
 In Paris Square
Jerusalem
 On Ben Yehuda Street

Asia

Georgia

Tbilisi

Macau

 In S. Francisco Garden, installed in 2004.
 In the town centre of Taipa, installed in 2005.

See also
Henry D. Cogswell

References

Further reading
 Marie-Hélène Levadé and Hugues Marcouyeau, Les fontaines de Paris : l'eau pour le plaisir. Paris, 2008  
 Daniel Rabreau, Paris et ses fontaines. Paris, 1997

External links

 Mairie of Paris: the 108 Wallace fountains 
 GHM Sommevoire – manufacturer Wallace fountain 

Buildings and structures in Paris

Street furniture
Fountains in Paris
1872 in France
Cast-iron sculptures